In Islamic tradition the two kiraman katibin ( ‘honourable scribe’), are two angels called Raqib and Atid, believed by Muslims to record a person's actions. Whether a person is sent to Jannah (paradise) or Jahannam (hell/purgatory) is not, however, dependent on whether good deeds outweigh bad deeds; but is ultimately up to God's mercy upon a believer. The Quran refers to them in two places, in 50:16-18 and by name as ‘Noble Recorders' in 82:10-12.

The work of the kiraman katibin is to write down and record every action of a person each day. One angel figuratively sits on the right shoulder and records all good deeds, while the other sits on the left shoulder and records all bad deeds.

The book in which the angels are writing is the cumulative record of a given person's deeds. After that person's death, it is said that on the Day of Judgement each person will be confronted with this record, and the two angels will be present to tell God of what the person did.

Relation to the "followers" 
These angels are not guardian angels, called in Islamic tradition the mu'aqqibat "followers" (Q.13.10-11). According to many Muslims (see below), each human has two guardian angels, in front and behind him, while the two recorders are located right and left.

Muhammad said: "There is no one among you but he has with him a constant companion (qareen) from among the jinn and a constant companion from among the angels." They said, "You too, O Messenger of Allah?" He said, "Me too, but Allah has helped me against him (the devil-companion) and he has become Muslim.""

See also 
 List of angels in theology
 List of characters and names mentioned in the Quran
 Watcher (angel)

References 

Angels in Islam
Classes of angels
Individual angels
Islamic eschatology